Bishop Cristoforo Memmolo, C.R. (1586 – 1646) was a Roman Catholic prelate who served as Bishop of Ruvo (1621–1646).

Biography
Cristoforo Memmolo was born in Benevento, Italy in 1586 and ordained a priest in the Congregation of Clerics Regular of the Divine Providence.
On 29 March 1621, he was appointed during the papacy of Pope Paul V as Bishop of Ruvo.
On 18 April 1621, he was consecrated bishop by Giovanni Garzia Mellini, Cardinal-Priest of Santi Quattro Coronati with Attilio Amalteo, Titular Archbishop of Athenae, and Paolo De Curtis, Bishop Emeritus of Isernia, serving as co-consecrators. 
He served as Bishop of Ruvo until his death in May 1646.

References

External links and additional sources
 (for Chronology of Bishops) 
 (for Chronology of Bishops) 

17th-century Italian Roman Catholic bishops
Bishops appointed by Pope Paul V
1586 births
1646 deaths
Theatine bishops
People from Benevento